Javier Cercas Mena (born 1962 in Ibahernando) is a Spanish writer and professor of Spanish literature at the University of Girona, Spain.

He was born in  Ibahernando, Cáceres, Spain. He is a frequent contributor to the Catalan edition of El País and the Sunday supplement. He worked for two years at the University of Illinois at Urbana-Champaign in the United States.

He is one of a group of well-known Spanish novelists, which includes Julio Llamazares, Andrés Trapiello, and Jesus Ferrero, who have published fiction in the vein of "historical memory", focusing on the Spanish Civil War and the Francoist State.<ref>Gina Herrmann,  Mass Graves on Spanish TV, essay in Unearthing Franco's Legacy, p.172, 2010</ref>Soldiers of Salamis (translated by Anne McLean) won the Independent Foreign Fiction Prize in 2004, and McLean's translations of his novels The Speed of Light and Outlaws were shortlisted for the International Dublin Literary Award in 2008 and 2016 respectively.

In 2014–15, he was the Weidenfeld Visiting Professor of European Comparative Literature in St Anne's College, Oxford. In 2016 he was awarded the European Book Prize for The Imposter.

Bibliography
 1987, El móvil 
 1989, El inquilino (The Tenant and the Motive) (English translation, 2005)
 1994, La obra literaria de Gonzalo Suárez 
 1997, El vientre de la ballena 
 1998, Una buena temporada 
 2000, Relatos reales 
 2001, Soldados de Salamina (Soldiers of Salamis) (English translation  by Anne McLean, 2004)
 2005, La velocidad de la luz (The Speed of Light) (English translation by Anne McLean, 2006)
 2009, Anatomía de un instante (The Anatomy of a Moment) (English translation by Anne McLean, 2011)
 2012, Las leyes de la frontera (published as Outlaws) (English translation by Anne McLean, 2014)
 2014,   (The Impostor) (English translation by Frank Wynne, 2017)
 2017, El monarca de las sombras (Literatura Random House, Feb 2017)
 2018, The Blind Spot'' (MacLeHose Press) (English translation by Anne McLean, 2018)

References

External links
 Berlin Literature Festival Bio 
 The right to self destruction. Translation of El derecho a destruirse published in El País Semanal on 4-Dec-2005.
 Saying the right thing. Translation of La corrección de la incorrección published in EL PAIS SEMANAL - 29-01-2006.

1962 births
Living people
People from Tierra de Trujillo
Spanish essayists
Writers from Extremadura
20th-century Spanish novelists
21st-century Spanish novelists
Spanish male novelists
Male essayists
20th-century essayists
21st-century essayists
20th-century Spanish male writers
21st-century Spanish male writers
University of Girona alumni